A hybrid train is a locomotive, railcar or train that uses an onboard rechargeable energy storage system (RESS), placed between the power source (often a diesel engine prime mover) and the traction transmission system connected to the wheels. Since most diesel locomotives are diesel-electric, they have all the components of a series hybrid transmission except the storage battery, making this a relatively simple prospect.

Surplus energy from the power source, or energy derived from regenerative braking, charges the storage system. During acceleration, stored energy is directed to the transmission system, boosting that available from the main power source. In existing designs, the storage system can be electric traction batteries, or a flywheel. The energy source is diesel, liquefied petroleum gas, or hydrogen (for fuel cells) and transmission is direct mechanical, electric or 

Diesel electric locomotives may have most of what they need for regenerative braking since they might already use dynamic braking. This uses the traction motors as generators to convert much of the train's kinetic energy to electrical energy, but without a way to store the generated electricity it is simply converted to heat with large rooftop resistor banks and dumped to the atmosphere with the aid of cooling fans.

Using a storage system means that a non-fully electric train can use regenerative (as opposed to merely dynamic) braking, and even shut down the main power source whilst idling or stationary. Reducing energy consumption provides environmental benefits and economic savings.  A smaller scale version of the concept is found in hybrid automobiles, such as the Chevrolet Volt.

Development
The Patton Motor Car, manufactured by Patton Motor Company, was a gas-electric hybrid system, although the term hybrid was not yet in use. William H. Patton filed for a patent on February 25, 1889; the drawings on his patent application resemble later descriptions of his first prototype.  Patton built a tram car that was in experimental service in Pullman, Illinois in 1891 and a small Patton locomotive was sold to a street railway company in Cedar Falls, Iowa in 1897. The latter used a 2-cylinder, 25 hp gasoline engine to drive a 220 volt generator that served to charge the 200 Ampere hour 100 cell lead acid battery in parallel with the traction motors. The engine ran at constant speed, with a shunt-wound generator that also served as an electric starter motor. A conventional series-parallel controller was used for the two 35 hp traction motors that drove the wheels of the locomotive.

The term mixed drive train came to be used at the turn of twentieth century. The Pieper system was applied to Belgian (Vicinal tramway) and French (Compagnie des Chemins de Fer de Grande Banlieue) railcars as early as 1911.

The Thomas system, manufactured by Thomas Transmission Ltd. of England, which is similar in design to the mechanical part of the Hybrid Synergy Drive, was used in the United Kingdom and tested in New Zealand in a NZR RM class railcar.

Czechoslovakia
In 1986, Czechoslovak locomotive manufacturer ČKD built a prototype hybrid shunting locomotive termed the DA 600. The locomotive was powered a 190-kW diesel engine and four electric motors, with a maximum overall power 360 kW powered from batteries. The batteries were recharged while the diesel engine was running, by regenerative braking or from external electric power.

After tests on the Railway test circuit Velim and some minor tweaks, the locomotive was lent to the Olomouc train depot and successfully operated there for ten years. Czechoslovak socialist economics failed to start mass production, mainly because of a lack of proper battery manufacturing capacities.

Japan
In May 2003, JR East started test runs using a KiYa E991 "NE Train" ("New Energy Train") railcar, testing the system performance in cold regions.

The design had two 65-kilowatt fuel cells and six hydrogen tanks under the floor, with a lithium-ion battery on the roof. Research was underway into the use of regenerative braking to recharge the test train's batteries, intending to increase the range further. JR had stated that it hoped to introduce the train into scheduled local service during the summer of 2007. Technology tested on this train was incorporated in the KiHa E200 diesel/battery railcars entering service in 2007.

The first JR Freight Class HD300 shunting locomotive was delivered from Toshiba on 30 March 2010. The new locomotive uses lithium ion batteries, and is designed to reduce exhaust emissions by at least 30% to 40% and noise levels by at least 10 dB compared with existing Class DE10 diesel locomotives.

Multiple units
 NE Train, experimental railcar
 KiHa E200, single-car units introduced in 2007

 HB-E300 series, introduced in 2010
 HB-E210 series, introduced in 2015
 YC1 series, introduced in 2018
 HC85 series, introduced in 2022

Locomotives
 JR Freight Class HD300, delivered in 2010, entering service from 2012

Russia
Sinara transport machines is developing the TEM9H, a hybrid version of its TEM9 series diesel shunting locomotives, at its Lyudinovsky Locomotive Plant. This is a 1,200 horsepower, four-axle, locomotive with lithium-ion batteries, supercondensers and AC motors. It is planned to be in production early in 2013.

United Kingdom
A Sunday-service operated on the Stourbridge Town Branch Line for a period of two years, using a flywheel-based energy storage system built by Parry People Movers. In 2008, a pair of British Rail Class 139 railcars were ordered to provide full service on the branch line from 2009 onwards.

During 2007, a modified Class 43 power car ran on the Great Central Railway and then as part of the Network Rail New Measurement Train (a 200-kilometre per hour track-recording train). The Hitachi developed system used a battery-assisted diesel-electric drive system; the hope being that it would demonstrate a cut in emissions by up to 50 percent and a reduction in fuel consumption costs of 20 percent.  The modified locomotive, named Hayabusa, was semi-permanently attached to a converted passenger carriage containing the battery bank during the testing period.

Since 2015, Vivarail has converted some former London Underground D78 Stock for rural services, branding them as D-Train. Some of these converted Class 230 units employ hybrid diesel-electric series propulsion.

In 2022, Chiltern introduced to revenue service a Class 168 whose diesel hydraulic transmission had been retrofitted with a diesel hybrid drive.

North America

Railpower

In 2004, Railpower Technologies, a Canadian company, began running pilots in the United States with the Green Goat shunting locomotives. The trials led to orders by the Union Pacific and Canadian Pacific Railways, starting in early 2005. These diesel-electric hybrid trains are expected to cut emissions by up to 90 percent and to decrease fuel consumption by up to sixty percent, when compared to conventional diesel-powered locomotives. The "Green Goat" locomotives were intended to be used in marshalling yards.

General Electric
General Electric (GE) put their hybrid locomotive on display at Los Angeles Union Station on May 24, 2007. The locomotive used regenerative braking and a bank of high-capacity batteries that GE was constructing to achieve its fuel savings and to achieve higher emissions standards than previous ordinary diesel locomotives. It was expected to join GE's current line of Evolution Series locomotives .

Savannah, Georgia
The city of Savannah, Georgia tested the operation of a W class Melbourne tram in service as a biodiesel fuelled hybrid with on board battery storage in late 2008. Regular service along the River Street Streetcar started on February 11, 2009.

Greece

Hitachi Hybrid trains began construction in July 2019. They will be available throughout Greece from 2022.

France 
Between 2021 and 2022, the French regions of Centre-Val de Loire, Occitanie, Nouvelle Aquitaine and Grand Est in partnership with SNCF and Alstom, will start test runs using an hybrid Regiolis railcar (Diesel/Battery), before starting regular service on 2023.

See also

 Steam diesel hybrid locomotive (combined steam and diesel locomotive)
 Electro-diesel locomotive or Dual-mode locomotive (powered by external electric supply or on-board diesel engine)
 Hybrid vehicle
 Hybrid vehicle drivetrain
 List of hybrid vehicles
 Railpower Technologies
 Renewable energy
 Brookville Liberty Modern Streetcar

References